The Skyjacker's Tale is a Canadian documentary film, directed by Jamie Kastner and released in 2016. The film centres on Ishmael Muslim Ali (formerly Ishmael LaBeet), who received a disputed conviction of murder in the Fountain Valley massacre of 1972 before hijacking a plane to Cuba in 1984. It mixes interviews, including the first interview given by Ali himself since the incident, with dramatic reenactments of the hijacking.

The film premiered at the 2016 Toronto International Film Festival. It was acquired by Strand Releasing for release in the United States in 2017.

The film received a Canadian Screen Award nomination for Best Cinematography in a Documentary (Derek Rogers) at the 5th Canadian Screen Awards.

References

External links
 

2016 films
2016 documentary films
Canadian documentary films
Documentary films about terrorism
Films directed by Jamie Kastner
2010s English-language films
2010s Canadian films
English-language Canadian films